Bicknell is a surname.

Bicknell may also refer to:

 Bicknell, Indiana, United States, a city
 Bicknell, Utah, United States, a town